The N34 is the coastal road in Belgium connecting Knokke in the east with De Panne in the west, running along the coast line.

034